Mikhail Petrovich Petrov (17 November 1904 – 5 August 1967) was a Tatar Soviet Army colonel and a Hero of the Soviet Union. Petrov was awarded the title for his actions in Operation Bagration, during which he led his regiment in encircling Mogilev. He continued to serve in the Soviet Army postwar, retiring in 1954, after which he moved to Vinnytsia.

Early life 
Petrov was born on 17 November 1904 in the village of Stary Sharashly in Ufa Governorate, now in the Bakalinsky District of Bashkortostan, to a peasant family. After graduating from school in the village of Bakaly in 1916, he worked as a messenger at the volost (parish) committee. He later worked as a fitter at the Baysarovskom Telegraph Department in the Bashkir Autonomous Soviet Socialist Republic. In 1926, he was drafted into the Red Army. In 1929, he became a Communist Party of the Soviet Union member.

World War II 
Petrov fought in World War II from November 1941, originally as a battalion commissar. On 10 January 1942, he was awarded the Order of the Red Banner. In 1944, he graduated from the Vystrel course. Petrov became commander of the 139th Rifle Division's 364th Rifle Regiment. Petrov led the  regiment in Operation Bagration. Breaking through German defenses, the regiment crossed the Pronya River, the Basy River, and the Resta River between 24 and 26 June 1944. On 27 June, Petrov was awarded the Order of the Red Banner. On 28 June the regiment crossed the Dnieper south of Mogilev. The regiment captured 215 settlements and cut off the German retreat. According to Petrov's superiors, the regiment captured 242 soldiers, 120 guns, 600 machine guns and automatic rifles, 12 tractors, 9 warehouses, 235 motor vehicles, and killed 1,200 German soldiers. He was awarded the Order of Alexander Nevsky on 19 September. On 24 March 1945, Petrov was awarded the title Hero of the Soviet Union and the Order of Lenin.

Postwar 
In 1949, Petrov graduated from the Leningrad Higher Armored School. He retired in 1954 as a colonel, then lived and worked in Vinnytsia. He died there on 5 August 1967.

References 

1904 births
1967 deaths
People from Bashkortostan
People from Belebeyevsky Uyezd
Tatar people of Russia
Communist Party of the Soviet Union members
Soviet colonels
Soviet military personnel of World War II
Heroes of the Soviet Union
Recipients of the Order of Lenin
Recipients of the Order of the Red Banner
Recipients of the Order of Alexander Nevsky
Recipients of the Order of the Red Star